Mimaletis watulekii is a moth in the family of Geometridae first described by Robert Herbert Carcasson in 1962.

This species is known from Nigeria and has a wingspan of 18–20 mm. The author dedicated this species to its discoverer, Mr. Bonifacio Watuleki.

References

External links
Geometridae.de: Images of the type

Ennominae
Moths described in 1962